Michele Ferrero (born 1967) is a Catholic priest, born in Cuneo, Italy, Salesian of Don Bosco, Professor of Moral Theology and Classics, graduated from Taipei Fu Jen Catholic University. Faculty of Theology.   He is author of books and articles about Taiwan, China and moral theology. He holds a doctoral degree in theology and a degree in Classics ("Laurea in Lettere Classiche") from the State University of Torino (Italy). He has served in Taiwan, Hong Kong, Shanghai, Turin, Italy and Jerusalem. He is the author of "The cultivation of virtue in Matteo Ricci's 'The true meaning of the Lord of Heaven'"(Fu Jen Catholic University Press, Taipei, 2004), an important study on moral issues common to the Christian and the Confucian traditions.
He is currently teaching Latin and Western Classics at Beijing Foreign Studies University. He works as Foreign Expert in Latin at the National Research Centre of Overseas Sinology of Beijing Foreign Studies University.

He wrote "Il Cardinale Zen. Rosso Speranza" (Torino, Elledici, 2007); "Tuo padre ed io ti cercavamo" (with R. Spataro, Jerusalem, Latin Patriarchate Printing Press, 2007); “Saint Paul educator to faith and love” (with R. Spataro, Latin Patriarchate Printing Press, Jerusalem, 2008), “Sinologia Spirituale”, LAS, Roma, 2011.

Among his other publications are “Il prato dell’arcobaleno”(Torino: LDC, 1991);“Dalla Selecta ex Christianis Latinis Scriptoribus di don Bosco alla “Corona Patrum” della SEI”, in: G. Proverbio (ed.), “Dum Docent Discunt. Per una Didattica delle Lingue Classiche”, Patron, Bologna, 2000; “Grano e riso”(Cuneo: Primalpe, 2002);“Ira e sacrificio nel Confucianesimo”, in: M. Marin – M. Mantovani, Ira e sacrificio : negazione del divino e dell'umano? LAS, Rome, 2004; "Education in Confucianism", in: C. Desbouts - M. Mantovani, "Didattica delle scienze", Libreria Editrice Vaticana, Roma, 2010.
“Matteo Ricci, Cicerone e il concetto di «rito» nel confucianesimo”, in: Rivista liturgica 97, no. 2 (mar/apr 2010)
“The extraordinary experience of priesthood of Father Matteo Ricci (1552-1610)”, in: Caputa G. – Fox J., “Priests of Christ in the Church for the World”, Studium Theologicum Salesianum, Jerusalem, 2010.
“Chinese Classics in Matteo Ricci’s 天主实义 and its reception in Korea”, in: Korea University, “Chinese Classics and the culture of East Asia” (中国古代文化和东Asia, the book is in Korean, Chinese and English), Korea University Press, 2010.
“L’evoluzione storica della parola latina per “Cina”” , in Salesianum 4/2011.

His articles have appeared on periodicals of the following institutions: Salesian University, Rome; Fudan University (“Religion, Ethics, Moral Concern”, 2003), Shanghai, Holy Spirit Seminary, Hong Kong (“Ching Feng”); Seminary of Torino (“Archivio Teologico Torinese).

In June 2011 he promoted the first conference on “The teaching of Latin language in Chinese universities” at the Beijing Foreign Studies University.
In 2012 was appointed director of "Latinitas Sinica", Centre for Latin Language and Culture of Beijing Foreign Studies University.
In 2014 the Commercial Press published his Latin grammar for Chinese students: "拉丁语基础教程 Lingua Latina ad Sinenses Discipulos Accomodata"  and in 2016 the Commercial Press published "1234 Sententiae, Proverbia et Sigla Latina".
He is also chief editor of the "Journal Of Latin Language And Culture".

References

21st-century Italian Roman Catholic theologians
21st-century Italian Roman Catholic priests
1967 births
Living people
Fu Jen Catholic University alumni